People's Television may refer to:

People's Television Network, a state-owned television station in the Philippines
PTV (Thailand), a former satellite television station in Thailand